Fritz Feierabend (29 June 1908 – 25 November 1978) was a Swiss bobsledder who competed at 1936, 1948 and 1952 Winter Olympics. He won three silver and two bronze medals in two-man and four-man events.

Feierabend also won twelve medals at the FIBT World Championships with six golds (two-man: 1947, 1950, 1955; four-man: 1939, 1947, 1954), three silvers (two-man: 1949; four-man: 1950, 1955), and three bronzes (two-man: 1938, four-man: 1935, 1949).

Feierabend retired after the 1955 World Championships. Together with his father he constructed bobsleighs, including the first all-steel bobsleigh.

References

External links

 Bobsleigh two-man Olympic medalists 1932-56 and since 1964
 Bobsleigh four-man Olympic medalists for 1924, 1932-56, and since 1964
 Bobsleigh two-man world championship medalists since 1931
 Bobsleigh four-man world championship medalists since 1930

1908 births
1978 deaths
Swiss male bobsledders
Olympic bobsledders of Switzerland
Bobsledders at the 1936 Winter Olympics
Bobsledders at the 1948 Winter Olympics
Bobsledders at the 1952 Winter Olympics
Olympic silver medalists for Switzerland
Olympic bronze medalists for Switzerland
Olympic medalists in bobsleigh
Medalists at the 1936 Winter Olympics
Medalists at the 1948 Winter Olympics
Medalists at the 1952 Winter Olympics
20th-century Swiss people